The Cypriot Chess Championship is organized by the Cyprus Chess Federation, which joined FIDE in 1961.

List of winners

{| class="sortable wikitable"
! Year !! Champion
|-
| 1961 || Georgios Kleopas
|-
| 1962 || Georgios Kleopas
|-
| 1963 || 
|-
| 1965 || Byron Zappas
|-
| 1966 || Georgios Kleopas
|-
| 1967 || Andreas Lantsias
|-
| 1968 || Andreas Hadjikypris
|-
| 1969 || Agathoclis Constantinou
|-
| 1970 || Petros Avgousti
|-
| 1971 || Petros Avgousti
|-
| 1973 || N. Avraamidis
|-
| 1974 || Conrad Riza
|-
| 1976 || Avgousti Avgoustinos
|-
| 1977 || Agathoclis Constantinou
|-
| 1980 || Agathoclis Constantinou
|-
| 1981 || Agathoclis Constantinou
|-
| 1982 || Agathoclis Constantinou
|-
| 1983 || Constantinos Hadjiyiannis
|-
| 1984 || Agathoclis Constantinou
|-
| 1985 || Andreas Savva
|-
| 1986 || Marios Schinis
|-
| 1987 || Agathoclis Constantinou
|-
| 1988 || Herodotos Ipsarides
|- 
| 1989 || Agathoclis Constantinou
|-
| 1990 || Marios Schinis
|-
| 1991 || Agathoclis Constantinou
|-
| 1992 || Marios Schinis
|- 
| 1993 || Matthaios Christodoulou
|-
| 1994 || Antonis Georghiou
|- 
| 1995 || Panikos Savva
|-
| 1996 || Paris Klerides
|-
| 1997 || Paris Klerides
|- 
| 1998 || Herodotos Ipsarides
|-
| 1999 || Antonis Antoniou
|-
| 2000 || Yuri Poluektov
|-
| 2001 || Paris Klerides
|-
| 2002 || Paris Klerides
|-
| 2003 || Antonis Antoniou
|-
| 2004 || Paris Klerides
|-
| 2005 || Antonis Antoniou
|-
| 2006 || Iulian Baltag
|-
| 2007 || Iulian Baltag
|-
| 2008 || Vassilis Aristotelous
|-
| 2009 || Alkis Martidis
|-
| 2010 || Antonis Antoniou
|-
| 2011 || Antonis Antoniou
|-
| 2012 ||Antonis Antoniou
|-
| 2013 || Andreas Kelires
|-
| 2014 ||Andreas Kelires
|-
| 2015 ||Paris Klerides
|-
| 2016 || Konstantinos Michaelides
|-
| 2017 || Konstantinos Michaelides
|-
| 2018 || Konstantinos Michaelides
|-
| 2019 || Ioannis Damianou 
|-
| 2020 ||  Pavlos Constantinou 
|-
| 2021 || Konstantinos Michaelides
|-
| 2022 || Konstantinos Michaelides
|}

References

Chess national championships
Chess in Cyprus
Recurring sporting events established in 1961
1961 in chess
Chess
Chess
Chess